Farmington Public Schools is a school district headquartered in Farmington, Connecticut.

Schools
Farmington High School (9-12)

Middle schools 
Irving A. Robbins Middle School (7-8)
Elementary schools
West Woods Upper Elementary School (5-6)
East Farms Elementary School (K-4)
Noah Wallace Elementary School (K-4)
Union Elementary School (K-4)
West District Elementary School (K-4)

References

External links
 Farmington Public Schools
Farmington, Connecticut
School districts in Connecticut